Southern Illinois University Carbondale has had a number of notable alumni since it was first founded in 1869.

Academics
Robert Coover, T.B. Stowell Adjunct Professor of Literary Arts at Brown University
 Gertrude Hull - history teacher for 40 years. Was a tutor to Douglas MacArthur.
 Louise Huffman - teacher and educator on US Antarctic programs
Sir Curtis Price, KBE, current head of New College, Oxford, former President of the Royal Academy of Music and former president of the Royal Musical Association
 Wilfred Reilly - Kentucky State University professor, author of "Hate Crime Hoax," and opponent of the alt-right movement.

Artists 
 Najjar Abdul-Musawwir, artist

Business people
Curt Jones, founder of Dippin' Dots
Kenny Troutt, founder of telecommunications company Excel Communications

Crime
 Timothy Krajcir, serial killer

Entertainers 
 James Belushi, actor/comedian
 Hannibal Buress, stand-up comedian, actor, writer and producer.
 Oyd Craddock, producer, writer and director
 Don S. Davis, actor best known for role on Stargate SG-1
 Jackie Debatin (attended), actress and businesswoman
 Bil Dwyer, actor, comedian
 Dennis Franz, actor best known for his work on NYPD Blue
 Dick Gregory (attended), actor, author, comedian, activist
 Justin Hartley, actor, best known for role on This is Us
 Steve James, documentary director and producer of Sundance award winning Hoop Dreams and Stevie
 Jenny McCarthy (attended), actress and Playmate of the Year, was studying nursing at SIU when she submitted her photo to Playboy
 Melissa McCarthy, actress, famous for her role in Gilmore Girls and the motion picture Spy
 Gary Miller, ESPN SportsCenter anchor
 Tom Minton, animation producer, writer, artist
 Bob Odenkirk, actor/writer/comedian
 Tim O'Malley, actor/comedian, Godshow, Second City alum
 Randal Mario Poffo, also known as professional wrestler Macho Man Randy Savage; graduated 1971
 Rick Rizzs, broadcaster for the Seattle Mariners
Richard Roundtree, actor, Shaft
[[Ken Swofford, film and television actor, best known for Thelma and Louise (1991 film), Murder She Wrote (1984 drama series)
Robert K. Weiss, producer of The Blues Brothers
Walt Willey, actor best known for All My Children

Musicians 
 Hamiet Bluiett, jazz saxophonist, clarinetist, and composer
 Shawn Colvin, musician, singer
 Lee England Jr., violinist, vocalist, arranger, and composer
 Open Mike Eagle, rapper
 Darryl Jones, bassist of The Rolling Stones
 David Lee Murphy, musician, singer
 Jason Ringenberg, musician, singer
 Mathien, singer, producer

Politicians and government officials

Federal government
Roland Burris, former U.S. Senator from Illinois (2009-2010). He previously served as Illinois Comptroller and Illinois Attorney General.
Jack Davis, U.S. Congressman from Illinois's 4th Congressional District who served from 1987-1989.
William Enyart, U.S. Congressman from Illinois's 12th Congressional District who served from 2013-2013. He earned his law degree from Southern Illinois University School of Law.
Julio M. Fuentes, Circuit Judge of the United States Court of Appeals for the Third Circuit.
Tim Lee Hall, U.S. Congressman who represented Illinois’s 15th Congressional District from 1975-1977.
Donald McHenry, United States ambassador to the United Nations (from 1979 to 1981)
Brett James McMullen, Retired Brigadier General, United States Air Force Brett James McMullen
David D. Phelps, U.S. Congressman from Illinois's 19th congressional district who served from 1999-2003.
Glenn Poshard, former U.S. Congressman, gubernatorial candidate, president of SIU
Larry O. Spencer, Vice Chief of Staff, United States Air Force Larry O. Spencer

Statewide officeholders
Randy Daniels, former New York Secretary of State
Albert E. Mead, former Governor of Washington

State legislators
Carl Bearden, member of the Missouri House of Representatives
Kenneth Buzbee, Democratic member of the Illinois Senate representing the 58th district (1972-1984)
John Cavaletto, Republican member of the Illinois House of Representatives representing the 107th district (2009–present).
Jerry Costello II, Democratic member of the Illinois House of Representatives representing the 116th district (2011–present).
William Davis, Democratic member of the Illinois House of Representatives representing the 30th district (2002–present).
Chad Hays, Republican member of the Illinois House of Representatives representing the 104th district (2010–present).
Jeanette Mott Oxford, Democratic member of the Missouri House of Representatives
Mary Nichols, Democratic member of the Missouri House of Representatives representing the 72nd district (2010–present).
Lena Taylor, Democratic member of the Wisconsin Senate for the 4th district (since 2005).
Art Turner, Democratic member of the Illinois House of Representatives (2010–present).
Kathleen Vinehout, Democratic member of the Wisconsin Senate representing the 31st district (since 2007).
Grant Wehrli, Republican member of the Illinois House of Representatives representing the 41st district (2015–present).
Whitney Westerfield, politician
Charles “Chuck” Ficago, candidate for Governor of Southern Illinois, on a platform of separating Chicago from Illinois, and fighting for the rights and interests of rural Illinoisans

Local officeholders
Howard Brookins, Chicago Alderman for the 21st ward.
Forrest Claypool, member of the Cook County Board of Commissioners for District 12 (2002-2006). He is currently the CEO of Chicago Public Schools.
David Coss, Mayor of Santa Fe, New Mexico (2006-2014)
Jason Ervin, Chicago Alderman for the 28th ward.

International figures
Muhammad Ijaz-ul-Haq, Pakistani politician and son of former President General Zia-ul-Haq
Joe Hung (Master's degree in journalism, 1965), Taiwanese journalist (Central News Agency) and diplomat, Representative of Taiwan to Italy (1993–2000)

Sports figures

Baseball 
Sam Coonrod, major league pitcher
Jim Dwyer, former Major League Baseball outfielder
Steve Finley, former Major League Baseball center fielder, 5-time Gold Glove winner, 2-time All-Star
Jason Frasor, Major League Baseball pitcher
Joe Hall, former Major League Baseball pitcher
Jerry Hairston Jr., Major League Baseball second baseman
Dan Hartleb, college baseball coach at Illinois
Duane Kuiper, former Major League Baseball second baseman, announcer, commentator for EA Sports baseball video games
Al Levine, Major League Baseball pitcher
Skip Pitlock, former Major League pitcher
Derek Shelton, Major League Baseball manager, Pittsburgh Pirates
Bill Stein, former Major League Baseball infielder
Dave Stieb, former Major League Baseball pitcher, 7-time All Star

Basketball
Ashraf Amaya, former NBA player
Chris Carr, former NBA player
Walt Frazier, Basketball Hall of Famer and named one of the 50 Greatest Players in NBA History
Mike Glenn, former NBA player
Bryan Mullins, current Men's Basketball Head Coach
Nate Hawthorne, former NBA player Los Angeles Lakers and Phoenix Suns.
Troy Hudson, NBA guard
Joe Meriweather, NBA center
Matt Shaw, Former European Professional League, Centralia High School sports Hall of Fame

Football
 Lionel Antoine, former NFL offensive tackle
 Houston Antwine, former NFL defensive lineman
 Tom Baugh, former NFL player
 Amos Bullocks, former NFL running back
 Jeremy Chinn, current NFL safety for the Carolina Panthers
 Madre Harper, current NFL cornerback for the Carolina Panthers
 Jim Hart, former NFL quarterback, 4-time Pro Bowl selection
Kevin House, former NFL player
 Brandon Jacobs, NFL running back
 Craig James, current NFL cornerback for the Philadelphia Eagles
 Yonel Jourdain, NFL running back for the Buffalo Bills
 Deji Karim, NFL running back for the Jacksonville Jaguars
 Carl Mauck, former NFL player and NFL coach
 Ryan Neal, current NFL safety for the Seattle Seahawks
 MyCole Pruitt, NFL tight end
 Marion Rushing, former NFL linebacker
 Bart Scott, NFL linebacker
 Sam Silas, former NFL lineman
 Russ Smith, former NFL guard
 Sebron Spivey, former NFL wide receiver
 Terry Taylor, former NFL cornerback
 Ernie Wheelwright, former NFL running back
 Adrian White, former NFL safety

Other 
Ron Ballatore, NCAA championship swimming coach, five-time Olympic swimming coach
Kim Chizevsky-Nicholls, IFBB professional bodybuilder
Roger Counsil, NCAA championship gymnastics coach
Mick Haley, USA Olympic volleyball coach
Frank Schmitz, Four time individual NCAA gymnastics champion and silver medalist at the 1965 Trampoline World Championships.
Cameron Wright, retired high jumper; competed at the 1996 Olympic Games; Southern Illinois University Hall of Fame 2011.

Writers and journalists 
Jim Bittermann, CNN European correspondent based in Paris
Chris Bury, ABC news anchor
Bill Christine, sports writer and author
Joan Lovett (Lovelace), CBS four-time Emmy award winner
Adrian Matejka, poet, finalist for the Pulitzer Prize and National Book Award in poetry
Michael Meyerhofer, poet and fantasy author
P.S. Mueller, cartoonist for The New Yorker
Jason Pargin, fantasy author
Jared Yates Sexton, author, political commentator, and creative writing professor
Chad Simpson, Micro Award-winning short and flash fiction author
Jackie Spinner, writer at the Washington Post and author of Tell Them I Didn't Cry: A Young Journalist's Story of Joy, Loss, and Survival in Iraq

Others
Matthew F. Hale (Law School, 1998), white supremacist who solicited the murder of federal judge Joan Lefkow
Joan E. Higginbotham, astronaut
Rodney P. Kelly, retired Major General, U.S. Air Force
Thomas McClelland, retired Captain, U.S. Navy
Johnny R. Miller, Assistant Adjutant General of the Illinois Army National Guard
Joseph Nechvatal, digital artist and art theoretician
Michael Swango, physician and serial murderer
Mallica Vajrathon, United Nations senior staff member

References

External links 
 Southern Illinois University-Carbondale Recreation Center's Distinguished Alumni Wall

Southern Illinois University